The Brisbane Cup is a Brisbane Racing Club Group 2 Thoroughbred horse race for three-year-olds and upwards, run under handicap conditions over a distance of 3200 metres at Eagle Farm Racecourse, Brisbane during the Queensland Winter Racing Carnival.  Prize money is A$400,000.

Due to track reconstruction of Eagle Farm Racecourse for the 2014–15 racing season the event was transferred to Doomben Racecourse with a slightly shorter distance of 2200 metres.

History
The race was named as the Victory Cup in 1946 when racing was resumed after World War II in Queensland.

Distance
 1866 -  miles (~3600 metres)
 
 1867–1882 – 2 miles  (~3200 metres)
 1883 -  miles (~2800 metres)
 1884–1887 – 2 miles  (~3200 metres)
 1888 -  miles (~2800 metres)
 1889–1941 – 2 miles  (~3200 metres)
 1942–1945 - Race not run during World War II
 1946 -  miles (~2400 metres)
 1947–1972 – 2 miles (~3200 metres)
 1973–2006 – 3200 metres
 2007–2014 – 2400 metres
 2015 – 2200 metres
 2016 – 2400 metres
 2017 – 2200 metres
 2018 – 2200 metres
 2019 – 2400 metres
2021 onwards – 3200 metres

Grade
 1866–1979 - Principal race
 1980–2006 - Group 1
 2007 onwards - Group 2

Venue
 2015 - Doomben Racecourse
 2017 - Doomben Racecourse
 2018 - Doomben Racecourse

Winners

 2022 - Irish Sequel
 2021 - Knights Order
 2020 - ‡race not held
 2019 - Sixties Groove
 2018 - Sedanzer
 2017 - Chocante
 2016 - Benzini
 2015 - Jetset Lad
 2014 - Floria
 2013 - Moriarity
 2012 - Lights Of Heaven
 2011 - Tullamore
 2010 - Crossthestart
 2009 - Scenic Shot
 2008 - Viewed
 2007 - Newport
 2006 - Art Success
 2005 - Portland Singa
 2004 - Danestorm
 2003 - Piachay
 2002 - Prized Gem
 2001 - Star Covet
 2000 - Yippyio
 1999 - Sheer Kingston
 1998 - Praise Indeed
 1997 - Desert Chill
 1996 - Dupain
 1995 - Desert Chill
 1994 - Sky Flyer
 1993 - Barbut Delcia
 1992 - Grooming
 1991 - Just A Dancer
 1990 - Shuzohra
 1989 - Coshking
 1988 - Lord Hybrow
 1987 - Limitless
 1986 - Marlon
 1985 - Foxseal
 1984 - Chiamare
 1983 - Amarant
 1982 - Queen's Road
 1981 - Four Crowns
 1980 - Love Bandit
 1979 - Grey Affair
 1978 - Muros
 1977 - Reckless
 1976 - Balmerino
 1975 - Herminia
 1974 - Igloo
 1973 - Irish Whip
 1972 - Mode
 1971 - Royal Shah
 1970 - Cachondeo
 1969 - Galleon King
 1968 - Prominence
 1967 - Fulmen
 1966 - Apa
 1965 - Fair Patton
 1964 - Fair Patton
 1963 - Campo
 1962 - Kamikaze
 1961 - Tulloch
 1960 - Valerius
 1959 - Macdougal
 1958 - Timor
 1957 - Cambridge
 1956 - Redcraze
 1955 - The Wash
 1954 - Lancaster
 1953 - Hydrogen
 1952 - Putoko
 1951 - Prince O' Fairies
 1950 - Silver Buzz
 1949 - Sanctus
 1948 - Sicarda
 1947 - Blue Boots
 1946 - Good Idea
 1942–45 - race not held
 1941 - Lady Buzzard
 1940 - Tragopan
 1939 - Spear Chief
 1938 - Spear Chief
 1937 - Glen's Spear
 1936 - Lough Neagh
 1935 - Rivalli
 1934 - St. Valorey
 1933 - Herolage
 1932 - St. Valorey
 1931 - Royal Smile
 1930 - Trainer
 1929 - In Petto
 1928 - Canning Queen
 1927 - Kentle
 1926 - Piastoon
 1925 - Te Kara
 1924 - Balaton
 1923 - Seremite
 1922 - Grichka
 1921 - Impeyan
 1920 - Golden Sunset
 1919 - Venerable
 1918 - Irish Princess
 1917 - Bunting
 1916 - Demeranthis
 1915 - Rue Victoria
 1914 - Cagou
 1913 - Rosard
 1912 - Goard
 1911 - Black Paint
 1910 - Curve
 1909 - Fightaway
 1908 - Plunder
 1907 - Haidee
 1906 - Scorcher
 1905 - Fitz Grafton
 1904 - Fitz Grafton
 1903 - Jessie
 1902 - Palmer
 1901 - Rabato
 1900 - Boreas Ii
 1899 - Dundonald
 1898 - Rubydor
 1897 - Battalion
 1896 - Tornado
 1895 - Orville
 1894 - Yelverton
 1893 - Tridentate
 1892 - Splendide
 1891 - Lurline
 1890 - Lyndhurst
 1889 - Quicksilver
 1888 - Sirius
 1887 - Wetherondale
 1886 - Bonnie Bee
 1885 - Lancer
 1884 - Legacy
 1883 - Mozart
 1882 - Proctor
 1881 - Lord Clifden
 1880 - Major
 1879 - Sydney
 1878 - †The Dean/Strathearn
 1877 - Sunrise
 1876 - Irish Stew
 1875 - Carbine
 1874 - Zanco
 1873 - Wanderer
 1872 - Zanco
 1871 - Greyskim
 1870 - Dandy
 1869 - Premier
 1868 - Sydney
 1867 - North Australian
 1866 - Forester

† Dead heat

‡ Not held because of the COVID-19 pandemic

See also
 List of Australian Group races
 Group races

References

Horse races in Australia
Open middle distance horse races
Sport in Brisbane
History of Brisbane
Recurring sporting events established in 1866
1866 establishments in Australia